The 2013 Boucherville municipal election was an election that was held on the 3rd of November 2013 to elect Boucherville's mayor and eight councillors.

Jean Martel and his party's eight candidates were elected. The voter turnout was 53.4%.

The election results were made available on the website of Québec's Ministry of Municipal Affairs and Housing.

Election Results

Mayor

District 1 (Marie-Victorin) Councillor

District 2 (Rivière-aux-Pins) Councillor

District 3 (Des Découvreurs) Councillor

District 4 (Harmonie) Councillor

District 5 (La Seigneurie) Councillor

District 6 (Saint-Louis) Councillor

District 7 (De Normandie) Councillor

District 8 (Du Boisé) Councillor

References

Boucherville
Boucherville
2013